François Nicolas Vincent Campenon (29 March 1772, Saint-François, Guadeloupe – 29 November 1843, Villecresnes) was a French poet and translator from Latin and English.

Biography

Works

Poems
Épître aux femmes (1800)
La Maison des champs, poëme (1810)
L'Enfant prodigue, poëme en IV chants (1811)
Poèmes et opuscules en vers et en prose (2 volumes, 1823)
Œuvres poétiques (1844)

Translations
Œuvres d'Horace, traduites par MM. Campenon et Després, accompagnées du Commentaire de l'abbé Galiani, précédées d'un essai sur la vie et les écrits d'Horace et de recherches sur sa maison de campagne (1821)
Histoire d'Écosse depuis la naissance de Marie Stuart jusqu'à l'avènement de Jacques VI au trône d'Angleterre par W. Robertson (3 volumes, 1821)
Chefs-d'œuvre des théâtres étrangers traduits en français (1822–23)
Histoire d'Angleterre depuis l'invasion de Jules César jusqu'à la révolution de 1688 par David Hume, et depuis 1688 jusqu'à 1760, par Smollett, continuée  jusqu'en 1783, par Adolphus, et terminée par un Précis des évènements qui se sont passés sous le règne de George III, jusqu'en 1820, par Aikin et quelques  historiens anglois, traduite de l'anglais, précédée d'un Essai sur la vie et les écrits de David Hume par M. Campenon (19 volumes, 1825–27).   Online text

Other
Voyage à Chambéry (1796). Republished : 2003.  Online text
Essais de mémoires ou Lettres sur la vie, le caractère et les écrits de J.-F. Ducis (1824)

References 

 Tyrtée Tastet, Histoire des quarante fauteuils de l'Académie française depuis la fondation jusqu'à nos jours, 1635-1855, volume III, 1855, p. 198-200.

External links
  
 Académie Française

1772 births
1843 deaths
Latin–French translators
English–French translators
French classical scholars
19th-century French writers
19th-century French historians
French male non-fiction writers
19th-century French male writers
19th-century translators